Julia Kaitlyn Roberts (born February 7, 1991) is an American professional soccer midfielder who last played for the Washington Spirit in the NWSL. She previously played for the Seattle Sounders Women of the W-League and has represented the United States at the U-16, U-17, and U-20 levels.

Early life
Roberts grew up in Frederick, Maryland and attended Urbana High School. In 2007, she helped the school's soccer team to the 3A State Championship, scoring two goals in the final game that went into penalty kicks. She was a three-time NSCAA All-State selection in high school before forgoing her senior season to participate in the FIFA U-17 World Cup.

Roberts also helped her nationally ranked club team, the McLean Freedom, to a national title in 2007.

Roberts was named 2009 Parade All-American and 2007 and 2008 NSCAA All-American. She was named #4 of the top 50 girl soccer players by ESPN in 2009.

University of Virginia
Roberts attended the University of Virginia. In 2011, she helped the Cavaliers make the NCAA quarterfinals after five seasons of being eliminated in the third round. In 2012, she helped the Cavaliers win the ACC championship in the final match against Maryland.

Playing career

Club

Seattle Sounders Women
In 2012, Roberts played for the Seattle Sounders Women. She made 13 appearances for a total of 932 minutes and provided one assist.

Washington Spirit 
In March 2013, Roberts was drafted by the Washington Spirit as a discovery player.

International
Roberts previously played on the United States Women's U-16, U-17 and U-20 soccer teams.

References

External links 
 Washington Spirit player profile
 US Soccer player profile
 Sounders Women player profile
 Virginia player profile
Video Q&A with Julia Roberts
 US Soccer: Not THAT Julia Roberts

Living people
Soccer players from Maryland
American women's soccer players
Seattle Sounders Women players
Sportspeople from Frederick, Maryland
USL W-League (1995–2015) players
Parade High School All-Americans (girls' soccer)
Virginia Cavaliers women's soccer players
Washington Spirit players
National Women's Soccer League players
1991 births
Women's association football midfielders